Chandra Bahadur Shahi is a Nepalese politician and Minister for Land Reform, Agriculture and Cooperatives of Karnali Province. He is also a member of Provincial Assembly of Karnali Province belonging to the CPN (Unified Socialist). Shahi, a resident of Soru Rural Municipality, was elected via 2017 Nepalese provincial elections from Mugu 1(B).

Electoral history

2017 Nepalese provincial elections

References

Living people
Year of birth missing (living people)
21st-century Nepalese politicians
Members of the Provincial Assembly of Karnali Province
People from Mugu District
Communist Party of Nepal (Unified Socialist) politicians
Nepal MPs 1999–2002